Morde & Assopra (Dinosaurs & Robots) is a Brazilian telenovela that aired on TV Globo from 21 March 2011 to 14 October 2011.

It stars Adriana Esteves, Marcos Pasquim, Flávia Alessandra, Mateus Solano, Elizabeth Savalla, and Ary Fontoura.

Synopsis
Paleontologist Júlia (Adriana Esteves) dreams of finding remains of a marine reptile, but an earthquake in Mount Fuji, Japan, ends her expectations. She sets off for the fictional town of Preciosa, where Abner (Marcos Pasquim), a farmer, believes a Titanosaurus fossil is buried in his coffee plantations. However, Abner is against the excavations and does not want to destroy his plantation. Júlia and Abner are opposites, but a passion is born between them. Meanwhile, Ícaro (Mateus Solano), fascinated by robotics, wants to create an android that resembles Naomi (Flávia Alessandra), the loved one he lost in an accident.

Cast
 Adriana Esteves as Júlia Freire de Aquino
 Marcos Pasquim as Abner Martins de Medeiros
 Flávia Alessandra as Naomi Gusmão (human) / Naomi (humanoid robot)
 Mateus Solano as Ícaro Sampaio
 Ary Fontoura as  Mayor Isaías "Zazá" Junqueira Alves
 Elizabeth Savalla as Minerva Alves
 Cássia Kis Magro as Dulce Maria 
 Jandira Martini as Salomé de Souza
 Vanessa Giácomo as Celeste de Souza Sampaio
 André Gonçalves as Áureo Alves
 Paulo Vilhena as Cristiano
 Carol Castro as Natália Sampaio
 Caio Blat as Leandro
 Bárbara Paz as Virgínia Lolato
 Paulo Goulart as Eliseu 
 Luís Melo as Oséas
 Nívea Stelmann as Lavínia Silva Guedes
 Tarcísio Filho as Pimentel
 Carla Marins as Amanda
 Marina Ruy Barbosa as Alice Alves
 Gabriela Carneiro da Cunha as Raquel Martins de Medeiros
 Sérgio Marone as Marcos Sampaio
 Otaviano Costa as Élcio/Elaine
 Max Fercondini as Wilson
 Ana Rosa as Dinorá 
 Suzy Rêgo as Duda Aguiar
 Luana Tanaka as Keiko Tanaka
 Ildi Silva as Lídia Santos
 Michel Bercovitch as John Lewis
 Rodrigo Hilbert as Fernando
 André Bankoff as Tiago
 Raphael Viana as Tadeu Ferreira
 Joaquim Lopes as Josué
 Cristina Mutarelli as Pink 
 Flávia Garrafa as Carolina
 Miriam Lins as Irene 
 Bruna Spínola as Abelha (Maria Eduarda)
 Klebber Toledo as Guilherme Duarte de Lima
 Erom Cordeiro as Father Francisco
 Guilherme Nasraui as Daniel 
 Thiago Luciano as Éverton
 Cosme dos Santos as Bento
 Ary França as Dorival
 Cláudio Jaborandy as Nivaldo 
 Fernando Roncato as Renato
 Neusa Maria Faro as Palmira
 Sandra Barsotti as Dora 
 Narjara Turetta as Lílian 
 Dhu Moraes as Janice 
 Vera Mancini as Cleonice
 Miwa Yanagizawa as Tieko Kobayashi
 Daniela Fontan as Marli
 Aline Peixoto as Márcia Gadelha
 Juliana Schalch as Lara 
 Jurema Reis as Maria João
 Camila Chiba as Hoshi Tanaka
 Bárbara Silvestre as Inês 
 Guilherme Gonzalez as Efraim
 Rael Barja as Tutu
 Anderson Di Rizzi as Sergeant Xavier
 Keff Oliveira as Caco 
 Marisol Ribeiro as Melissa 
 Carol Abras as Tânia
 Karla Karenina as Anecy Gadelha
 Veronica Rocha as Selma
 Chao Chen as Akira Kobayashi
 Mauro Gorini as Roney
 Dionísio Neto as Aquiles
 Oswaldo Lot as Zé Paulo
 Celso Bernini as Bira
 Ken Kaneko as Hinoue
 Márcio Tadeu de Lima as Herculano Gadelha
 Antônio Firmino as Ígor
 Leandro Ribeiro as Heitor
 Marcos Miura as Shiro
 Ricardo Vandré as Moisés

References

External links
 Official website 
 

2011 telenovelas
2011 Brazilian television series debuts
2011 Brazilian television series endings
TV Globo telenovelas
Brazilian LGBT-related television shows
Telenovelas by Walcyr Carrasco
Brazilian telenovelas
Portuguese-language telenovelas
Androids in television
Japanese-Brazilian culture